Chilhyeonsan (칠현산 / 七絃山) is a mountain of Gyeongsangnam-do, southeastern South Korea. It has an elevation of 349 metres.

See also
List of mountains of Korea

References

Mountains of South Korea
Mountains of South Gyeongsang Province